Mario Wschebor Wonsever (3 December 1939 – 16 September 2011) was an Uruguayan mathematician.  He earned his degree at the University of the Republic, Uruguay, where he was Dean of the Faculty of Sciences between 1987 and 1997, after actively participating in the process of its creation. Another important contribution from this period was the "Document of the four deans", in which the need to create a national system of tertiary education was laid out.

In the field of mathematics, he made important contributions to the areas of probability and statistics.

Mario Wschebor worked in the Centro de Matemática (Mathematics Centre), and among numerous other activities he was chair of the Centre International de Mathématiques Pures et Appliquées (CIMPA; International Centre for Pure and Applied Mathematics).

In November 2007, Wschebor was awarded the "Morosoli de Oro" prize for Uruguayan cultural personality of the year by the Lolita Ruibal Foundation of Minas, Uruguay.

References
espectador.com (Spanish) death notice, retrieved 2nd Oct 2011

External links
CIMPA
Document of the four deans (.doc)
Article on Wschebor's Morosoli de Oro

20th-century Uruguayan mathematicians
Uruguayan people of Jewish descent
1939 births
2011 deaths
University of Paris alumni